Effie Lee Boggess (née Narigon; December 27, 1927 – May 18, 2021) was an American politician in the state of Iowa.

Boggess was born in Adams County, Iowa. She attended Simpson College and was a farmer. A Republican, she served in the Iowa House of Representatives from 1995 to 2005 (87th district from 1995 to 2003 and 97th district from 2003 to 2005).

References

1927 births
2021 deaths
People from Adams County, Iowa
Simpson College alumni
Farmers from Iowa
Women state legislators in Iowa
Republican Party members of the Iowa House of Representatives
21st-century American women